Dotson Rader (born July 25, 1942, in Evanston, Illinois) is an American author and playwright who has published four novels and three works of non-fiction as well as the stage play God Looked Away about Tennessee Williams.

Biography
Initially a student at Columbia University with a side gig as a male hustler, Rader made his way into the elite echelons of the New York City literary scene. During the 1970s, he became the live-in love of the actress Ruth Ford. He is the author of several books, including I Ain't Marchin Anymore, about the on-campus protests and upheaval during the 1960s, the title inspired by the earlier song by Phil Ochs of the same name, and Cry of the Heart, about his long friendship with the famed American playwright Tennessee Williams, which began in the 1950s. For many years Rader has penned features and conducted interviews for Parade magazine. Rader's first play, God Looked Away, about Tennessee Williams, had a six-week trial run at the Pasadena Playhouse in Pasadena, California, in 2018 with Al Pacino in the titular role and Judith Light and Garrett Clayton in other featured turns.

References

External links

Finding aid to Dotson Rader papers at Columbia University. Rare Book & Manuscript Library.
Finding aid to John C. Weiser papers at Columbia University. Rare Book & Manuscript Library.

1942 births
American dramatists and playwrights
People from Illinois
Living people